1923 Emperor's Cup Final was the 3rd final of the Emperor's Cup competition. The final was played at Tokyo Koto-Shihan Ground in Tokyo on February 3, 1924. Astra Club won the championship.

Overview
Astra Club won their 1st title, by defeating defending champion, Nagoya Shukyu-Dan 2–1.

Match details

See also
1923 Emperor's Cup

References

Emperor's Cup
1923 in Japanese football